Vanwyksvlei or Van Wyk's Vlei (Afrikaans for Van Wyk's Marsh) is a small town in the Northern Cape, South Africa. 

Name 
The town is named after a farmer called Van Wyk, and the Afrikaans suffix vlei, meaning 'pond', 'marsh'. However, it is one of the driest places in South Africa, and the surrounding region is named the Dorsland (Afrikaans for Thirstland).

History 
Vanwyksvlei was founded in 1881. It later saw action in the Second Boer War where two Victoria Crosses were awarded; Harry Hampton  and Henry Knight were awarded the medal for gallant acts.

Vanwyksvlei Dam 
The Vanwyksvlei Dam was the first (1882) state-funded dam built in South Africa.

References

See also
 Vanwyksvlei Dam

Populated places in the Kareeberg Local Municipality
Karoo